Kamble is an Indian surname. Notable people with the surname include:

Arun Krushnaji Kamble (1953–2009), Indian Marathi writer, politician and activist
Arvind Kamble, Indian politician
B. C. Kamble (1919–2006), Indian politician, writer, editor, jurist, and social activist
Babytai Kamble (1929-2012), Indian Dalit activist and writer
Bhausaheb Malhari Kamble, Indian politician
D. N. P. Kamble (Devrao Namdevrao Pathrikar Kamble), Indian politician from the 1950s
Dilip Kamble (born 1963), Indian politician
G. Kamble (Gopal Balwant Kamble, 1918–2002), Indian painter
Milind Kamble, Indian entrepreneur
Milind Anna Kamble, Indian politician
N. M. Kamble (Narendra Marutrao Kamble,1925–2021), Indian politician
Nivruti Satwaji Kamble, Indian politician of the 1970s
Pramod Kamble (born 1964), Indian painter and sculptor
Ranjit Kamble, Indian politician
Shantabai Kamble (1923–2023), Indian Marathi writer and Dalit activist
Shivaji Kamble, Indian politician
Sunil Kamble, Indian politician 
Sunita Kamble, Indian veterinarian
T. M. Kamble (d. 2013), Indian politician and Ambedkarite activist
Tulsiram Kamble, Indian politician of the 1960s and 1970s
Uttam Kamble, Indian journalist and author

Indian surnames